Joanne Davila (born 1966) is a clinical psychologist known for her research on the romantic relationships and mental health of adolescents and adults, including the impact of social media use on relationships and well being. She is a Professor and Associate Director of Clinical Training int the Department of Psychology, at Stony Brook University.

In 2017, Stony Brook University honored Davila with the Chancellor’s Award for Excellence in Faculty Service. Davila is a Fellow of the American Psychological Association (Division 12, Society for Clinical Psychology)  the Association for Psychological Science, and the Association for Behavioral and Cognitive Therapies.

Davila is Editor-in-Chief of the Journal of Consulting and Clinical Psychology.  She served as the 2020 President of the Society for a Science of Clinical Psychology.

Biography 
Davila graduated with a B.A. cum laude with honors in psychology from New York University in 1988. She attended graduate school at University of California, Los Angeles (UCLA) where she obtained her Ph.D. degree in clinical psychology in 1993 under the supervision of Constance Hammen. Davila remained at UCLA for five more years as a post-doctoral fellow (1993-1996) and a visiting assistant professor (1996-1998). Davila was on the faculty of University at Buffalo (1998-2002) before moving to Stony Brook University in 2002.

Her research on change and stability in adult attachment security has been funded by grants from the National Science Foundation and the National Institute of Mental Health (NIMH).

Davila writes a blog titled Skills for Healthy Relationships for Psychology Today which offers evidence-based skills to improve romantic relationships. She is co-author (with Kaycee Lashman) of The Thinking Girl's Guide to the Right Guy: How Knowing Yourself Can Help You Navigate Dating, Hookups, and Love. She co-edited (with Kieran Sullivan) the volume Support Processes in Intimate Relationships.

Representative publications 
 Davila, J., Burge, D., & Hammen, C. (1997). Why does attachment style change? Journal of Personality and Social Psychology, 73 (4), 826–838.
 Davila, J., Hammen, C., Burge, D., Paley, B., & Daley, S. E. (1995). Poor interpersonal problem solving as a mechanism of stress generation in depression among adolescent women. Journal of Abnormal Psychology, 104(4), 592–600.
 Davila, J., Hershenberg, R., Feinstein, B. A., Gorman, K., Bhatia, V., & Starr, L. R. (2012). Frequency and quality of social networking among young adults: Associations with depressive symptoms, rumination, and corumination. Psychology of Popular Media Culture , 1 (2), 72–86.
 Davila, J., & Kashy, D. A. (2009). Secure base processes in couples: Daily associations between support experiences and attachment security. Journal of Family Psychology, 23(1), 76–88.
 Davila, J., Steinberg, S. J., Kachadourian, L., Cobb, R., & Fincham, F. (2004). Romantic involvement and depressive symptoms in early and late adolescence: The role of a preoccupied relational style. Personal Relationships, 11(2), 161–178.

References

External links 

 Faculty Homepage
Relationship and Development Center at Stony Brook University
Skills for Healthy Relationships website
 

American women psychologists
Stony Brook University faculty
New York University alumni
University of California, Los Angeles alumni
Living people
1966 births
American women academics
21st-century American women
American clinical psychologists